A suicide car bombing occurred on 17 July 2015 in the Iraqi city of Khan Bani Saad, targeting a local marketplace.  approximately 130 people were killed in the bombing, with a similar number of injured. Several people were killed by collapsed buildings. The bomb was hidden under an ice truck in an attempt to attract more people amid the heat. Responsibility for the attack was claimed by the Islamic State of Iraq and the Levant (ISIL).

Background
Prior to the attack, Iraqi officials had declared victory over ISIL in the Diyala Governorate where Khan Bani Saad is located after local forces and Shiite paramilitaries drove the ISIL members out of towns and villages. Insurgents, however, remained active in the governorate.

Bombing
According to two local police officials, the bomber announced he was selling ice and offering a discount because of the Eid al-Fitr holiday. The attacker then detonated a bomb, killing himself and between 120 and 130 people and injuring at least 130 more. Fifteen children were among the dead. Responsibility for the attack was claimed by the ISIL, which in a Twitter statement wrote that the attack had been conducted in response to the killing of Sunni Muslims in Hawija, and that  of explosives had been used in the attack.

Aftermath
In addition to those killed, 20 people were reported missing after the attack. Several buildings collapsed after the blast, crushing some people. Police major Ahmed al-Tamimi assessed the damage as "devastating". The authorities of Diyala Governorate, where Khan Bani Saad is located, declared three days of mourning and cancelled Eid al-Fitr festivities.

Reactions
  – Iraqi Speaker of the Parliament Salim al-Jabouri said the attack "struck an 'ugly sectarian chord'."
  – In a July 18 statement, White House National Security Council spokesman Ned Price called the attack in Iraq’s eastern Diyala Province "abhorrent" and denounced the IS group, also known as ISIL, for having "purposefully and viciously targeted Iraqi civilians".  He also added, "This latest attack is yet another painful example of the atrocities that the terrorist group ISIL continues to perpetrate against the people of Iraq."
  – Foreign Office Minister of State, Tobias Ellwood said: "I am appalled by the attack in Khan Bani Saad in Iraq’s Diyala province, which killed over 115 people and injured many more, including women and children. Carrying out such an attack during Eid Al-Fitr celebrations, when families and friends were gathered to mark the end of the holy month of Ramadan, is a heinous act. My thoughts and sympathies are with everyone affected." He also added: "The so-called Islamic State of Iraq and the Levant (ISIL) is a brutal terrorist organisation which has carried out horrific atrocities in Iraq. The UK remains committed to working with the Government of Iraq and the global coalition to defeat ISIL."
  – On July 18, UN General-Secretary Ban Ki-moon called the attack "heinous and devastating."

See also

 Timeline of the Iraq War (2015)
 List of terrorist incidents linked to ISIL
 List of terrorist incidents, 2015

References

2015 murders in Iraq
21st-century mass murder in Iraq
Mass murder in 2015
Mass murder in Iraq
Marketplace attacks in Iraq
Suicide car and truck bombings in Iraq
Terrorist incidents in Iraq in 2015
ISIL terrorist incidents in Iraq
Diyala Governorate
Violence against Shia Muslims in Iraq
July 2015 crimes in Asia
July 2015 events in Iraq